The 2023 NBL1 West season will be the third season of the NBL1 West and 34th overall in State Basketball League (SBL) / NBL1 West history. The regular season will begin on Friday 31 March and end on Saturday 22 July. The finals will begin on Friday 28 July and conclude with the women's grand final on Friday 11 August and the men's grand final on Saturday 12 August.

Regular season
The regular season will begin on Friday 31 March and end on Saturday 22 July after 17 rounds of competition. Easter games in round 2 are again scheduled for a blockbuster Thursday night, followed by Anzac Round in round 4 as well as Women's Round (7), Mental Health Round (12) and Indigenous Round (15).

Standings

Men's ladder

Women's ladder

Finals
The finals will began on Friday 28 July and consist of four rounds. The finals will conclude with the women's grand final on Friday 11 August and the men's grand final on Saturday 12 August.

Awards

Player of the Week

Coach of the Month

Statistics leaders

Regular season
 Men's Most Valuable Player: TBD
 Women's Most Valuable Player: TBD
 Men's Coach of the Year: TBD
 Women's Coach of the Year: TBD
 Men's Defensive Player of the Year: TBD
 Women's Defensive Player of the Year: TBD
 Men's Youth Player of the Year: TBD
 Women's Youth Player of the Year: TBD
 Sixth Man of the Year: TBD
 Sixth Woman of the Year: TBD
 Men's Leading Scorer: TBD
 Women's Leading Scorer: TBD
 Men's Leading Rebounder: TBD
 Women's Leading Rebounder: TBD
 Men's Golden Hands: TBD
 Women's Golden Hands: TBD
 All-NBL1 West Men's 1st Team:
 TBD
 TBD
 TBD
 TBD
 TBD
 All-NBL1 West Women's 1st Team:
 TBD
 TBD
 TBD
 TBD
 TBD

Finals
 Men's Grand Final MVP: TBD
 Women's Grand Final MVP: TBD

References

External links
 2023 fixtures

2023
2022–23 in Australian basketball
2023–24 in Australian basketball